Holmes Products Corp. or Holmes Group is a company based in Milford, Massachusetts, that produces mechanical fans, space heaters, and humidifiers.

History
Holmes Products was founded by Jordan Kahn in 1982. In 2005, Berkshire Partners, Holmes' parent company, sold Holmes Products to Jarden Corporation for US$625.9 million. At the time of the sale, the brands of Holmes included Rival (acquired in 1999), Crock-Pot, Bionaire and White Mountain.

References

External links
Official Website
Commercial Fridge

Manufacturing companies established in 1982
Companies based in Worcester County, Massachusetts
Manufacturing companies based in Massachusetts
Milford, Massachusetts
Home appliance manufacturers of the United States
Home appliance brands
American brands
1982 establishments in Massachusetts
2005 mergers and acquisitions
2016 mergers and acquisitions
Newell Brands